Harrow International School Beijing (HISB), or Harrow Beijing (HBJ), is a private school located in Chaoyang District, Beijing.

Harrow Beijing is a coeducational day school that initially taught pupils from age 11, unlike its namesake in the United Kingdom, which only teaches boys and begins instruction when its students are 13. Jehangir S. Pocha of The New York Times said that Harrow, which uses English as its instructional language, has "a wider approach to education" than traditional Chinese schools and it is one of several private schools that is attractive to Chinese parents who have "means who are looking to turn their children into global citizens".

History 

Harrow Beijing opened in 2005. It was the second British-style public school to open in China, after Dulwich College, which had opened a branch in Shanghai in 2004 and a branch in Beijing in 2005. It was the second international Harrow school to open, after Harrow International School, Bangkok. As of 2 December 2006 Harrow Beijing had 150 students.

Matthew Benjamin Farthing, the headmaster, said in 2006 that during the school's first year, most of the children were expatriates. These included those from the United Kingdom and what he described as "countries familiar with the value of a Harrow education". That year he said "but in two years I expect things will be different".

In 2022, due to changes in Chinese laws, the school will rename itself as the "Lide" School (北京市朝阳区礼德学校).

Affiliations 

Harrow International School Beijing is operated by a private company, Harrow Asia Limited. Harrow Asia Limited also operates Harrow International School, Bangkok.

Both schools operate under a license granted by Harrow School in London. Close ties exist between the schools, with teacher and pupil exchanges, interviews held at Harrow School, and day-to-day co-operation between staff. Harrow International School Beijing shares governors with Harrow School and they regularly visit the school.

In 2006, Harrow International School gained accreditation from the Council of International Schools (CIS). Harrow International School Beijing is also a member of the Federation of British International Schools in South East Asia and East Asia (FOBISSEA). Harrow International School Beijing is fully accredited by all the British Examinations Authorities including Edexcel, CIE, AQA and OCR.

Operations and structure 

Harrow International School Beijing is divided into four phases of progression:

The Pre-Prep Phase includes students from Early Years (age 3) to Year 5 (age 8–9).  Pre-Prep follows a form based curriculum with specialist teaching in Mandarin, PE, music and art.

The Preparatory Phase includes students from Year 6 (age 9–10) to Year 8 (age 11–12).  The teaching within this phase of the school increases subjects taught by specialist teachers until every subject is taught this way.

Senior School comprises students from Year 9 (age 12–13) to Year 11 (age 15–16).  Students within this phase continue to take every subject until Year 10 when they focus on those they are taking for their GCSEs in Year 11.

Sixth Form comprises the two oldest year groups (age 17–18) in the school.  Sixth formers study for the GCE 'A’ Levels . Since 2005 every student graduating the Sixth Form has gone to university. In 2010 46% of students achieved A* or A grade at 'A’ Level.

In 2015 the tuition for the year was 200,000 Renminbi ($32,220 U.S. dollars). China Daily ranked Harrow Beijing as the seventh most expensive private school in Beijing.

Campuses 

The school is located in Hegezhuang Village (何各庄村), Chaoyang District, Beijing, China. It is located halfway between Shunyi and Downtown Beijing.

Before April 2013, the school was split between two campuses. The old Lower School was based in Grassetown, Tongzhou, located in the countryside around Shunyi, Beijing. The Preparatory Phase occupied a separate building on the Lower School campus.

The old Upper School was located in Anzhen Xili, near the Beijing Olympic Stadium. It occupied the site of a former Chinese primary school in Chaoyang District, central Beijing.  It had been extensively refurbished and extended to provide a modern learning environment.

In April 2013 the school moved to a new, purpose-built, combined (Lower School and Upper School) campus in Hegezhuang, Chaoyang District. In August 2018 it reopened the Anzhen Xili campus, now as a nursery named City Campus.

Curriculum 
The curriculum of Harrow in Beijing is based on the National Curriculum for England and Wales. Students study A-Levels, GCSE, and other British qualifications.

Demographics 
Students include expatriates and Chinese nationals.

Extra-curricular activities 
Harrow has an enrichment activity system which allows students to pick their last class from Monday to Thursday.

Name change 
In April 2022, the school has changed its name in official documents to 北京朝阳区礼德学校 (Lide School, Chaoyang District, Beijing) as required by the Education Department of China. A new policy required all schools in mainland China to refrain from including the names of foreign countries and places, as well as the words "international", "global", and "world" in their names.

2023 Racism scandal 
In March 2023, a student was accused of being racist by the school administrators after suggesting to his geography teacher that other students may have not been paying attention in his class because he is black. The student was subsequently dismissed by the administration, but not before providing a list of other students who possibly engaged in racist activities. The incident led to a widespread culture of suspicion developing amongst students, who were afraid of being accused of racist and facing dismissal. The teacher involved in the incident has been strongly criticized by both students and parents for being irresponsible and not holding true to his own promise.

See also 

 Harrow School, in the United Kingdom
 Harrow International School Hong Kong, the Hong Kong counterpart of HBJ
 Harrow International School Shanghai, the Shanghai counterpart of HBJ
 Harrow International School, Bangkok, in Bangkok, Thailand

References

External links 

 Harrow International School Beijing

Schools in Chaoyang District, Beijing
International schools in Beijing
Cambridge schools in China
Educational institutions established in 2005
High schools in Beijing
British international schools in China
2005 establishments in China